Horse Jumper of Love is an American rock band from Boston, Massachusetts.

History
Horse Jumper of Love released their self-titled first studio album in 2016 to mixed reviews. The single “Ugly Brunette” from the album premiered on Stereogum and was later featured on NPR Music’s series Songs We Missed. On March 8, 2017 they performed an Audiotree live session in which they played tracks from their, at that point untitled, 2019 album ahead of its announcement. In April 2017, Joy Void reissued Horse Jumper of Love on 12" vinyl along with the previously unreleased bonus track "Orange Peeler." On April 22, 2019 Horse Jumper of Love announced their new album So Divine, set to release on June 28th through Run for Cover Records. The band also premiered the first single from the album, "Poison," via The Fader – along with a music video directed by Ty Ueda. It was also announced in April 2019 that, that July, HJOL would be opening up at several dates of seminal slowcore band Duster's United States east coast reunion tour.

Discography

Studio albums
Horse Jumper of Love (2016, Gawk Records, Disposable America, Joy Void)
So Divine (2019, Run for Cover)
Natural Part (2022, Run for Cover)

Live albums 

 Horse Jumper of Love on Audiotree Live (2017, audiotree)

Compilations 

 Demo Anthology (2016, Disposable America)

Members
 Dimitri Giannopoulos  – guitar, lead vocals
 John Margaris – bass, supporting vocals
 Jamie Vadala-Doran – drums

References

Rock music groups from Massachusetts
Musical groups from Boston